The Avangard (previously known as Objekt 4202, Yu-71 and Yu-74) is a Russian hypersonic glide vehicle (HGV) that can be carried as a MIRV payload by the UR-100UTTKh, R-36M2 and RS-28 Sarmat heavy ICBMs. It can deliver both nuclear and conventional payloads.

The Avangard is one of the six new Russian strategic weapons unveiled by Russian President Vladimir Putin on 1 March 2018.

History

According to Vladimir Putin, the US withdrawal from the ABM Treaty in 2002 forced Russia to start developing hypersonic weapons: "We had to create these [hypersonic] weapons in response to the US deployment of a strategic missile defense system, which in the future would be capable of virtually neutralizing, zeroing out all our nuclear potential". In 2007, when asked about U.S. plans to deploy ballistic missile defenses in Europe, Putin mentioned that Russia was developing “strategic weapons systems of a completely different type that will fly at hypersonic speed and will be able to change trajectory both in terms of altitude and direction".

In October 2016, another flight test was carried out using a R-36M2 heavy ICBM launched from Dombarovsky Air Base, successfully hitting a target at the Kura Missile Test Range. This was reportedly the first fully successful test of the glide vehicle.

On 1 March 2018, Russian President Vladimir Putin in his presidential address to the Federal Assembly in Moscow announced that testing of the weapon is now complete and that it has entered serial production. This was further confirmed by the commander of the Strategic Rocket Forces, Colonel General .

The latest flight test occurred on 26 December 2018. Avangard carried by a UR-100UTTKh ICBM launched from Dombarovsky Air Base successfully hit a target at the Kura Missile Test Range. The Deputy Prime Minister of Russia Yury Borisov stated a day later that the glider flew at 27 times the speed of sound, "invulnerable to interception".

According to Russian Defense Ministry's press service/TASS, the Avangard missile system with the hypersonic glide-vehicle was demonstrated to the US inspection group in accordance with the New START treaty procedures on November 24–26, 2019.

On 27 December 2019, the first missile regiment armed with the Avangard HGV officially entered combat duty.

On 19 September 2020, Herbert Efremov, an Advisor for Science at the NPO Mashinostroyenia, was awarded Order of St. Andrew for his contributions to the Avangard development.

Design
HGVs differ from traditional ballistic missiles by their ability to maneuver and operate at lower altitudes. The combination of maneuverability and high speed poses significant challenges for conventional missile defense. With the advantage again swinging toward attack, the defense industry is concerned that weapons of this type will reignite the kind of  arms race that dominated the cold war era.

According to open-source analysis by Jane's, Avangard is a pure glide vehicle without an independent propulsion system. When approaching a target, the glider supposedly is capable of sharp high speed horizontal and vertical evasive maneuvers in flight, which Russian officials claim makes it "invulnerable to any missile defence system". The blast yield of a nuclear warhead carried by the Avangard is reportedly more than 2 megatons TNT.

The high speed of the Avangard likely gives it far better target-penetration characteristics than lighter subsonic cruise-missiles. The Avangard weighs about 2,000 kg and travels at Mach 20–27, giving it the equivalent of 21 tons of TNT in kinetic energy.

Operators

Strategic Rocket Forces – The Strategic Rocket Forces are the only operator of the Avangard HGV. As of December 2022, 8 Avangard-equipped UR-100NUTTHs are deployed with:
 13th Red Banner Rocket Division at Yasny, Orenburg Oblast

See also

 HGV-202F
 MIRV
 Kh-47M2 Kinzhal
 3M22 Zircon
 BrahMos-II
 DF-ZF
 Boeing X-51 Waverider
 Prompt Global Strike
 DARPA Falcon Project
 Hypersonic Technology Demonstrator Vehicle
 Silbervogel
 Tupolev Tu-130

References

Further reading
 Andrew Cockburn, "Like a Ball of Fire: Andrew Cockburn on hypersonic weaponry", London Review of Books, vol. 42, no. 5 (5 March 2020), pp. 31–32. "'Welcome to the world of strategic analysis, where we program weapons that don't work to meet threats that don't exist.' This was what Ivan Selin, a senior Pentagon official, used to tell subordinates in the Defence Department in the 1960s." (p. 31.) Cockburn recounts impracticable-weapons projects, including Russia's Avangard "hypersonic glide missile", Ronald Reagan's "Star Wars" project, the US's 1951 nuclear-powered-bomber project, and the US's 1950s Dyna-Soar "boost-glide"-weapon project suggested by Walter Dornberger, a favorite of Hitler's who had overseen the V2 rocket program. "[T]he US and Russia have both taken Selin's axiom a step further: they mean to deploy a weapon that doesn't work against a threat that doesn't exist that was in turn developed to counter an equally non-existent threat." (p. 32.)

Nuclear weapons of Russia
Hypersonic aircraft
Post–Cold War weapons of Russia
Military equipment introduced in the 2010s